Microbianor globosus is a jumping spider species of the genus Microbianor that lives in South Africa. The male was first described in 2011.

References

Endemic fauna of South Africa
Salticidae
Spiders of South Africa
Spiders described in 2011
Taxa named by Wanda Wesołowska